Corruption in Syria follows the familiar patterns of state-based corruption, namely government officials abusing their political powers for private gain in the country of Syria.

According to Transparency International's 2022 Corruption Perception Index (CPI), Syria scored a 13 on the CPI on a scale from 0 ("highly corrupt") to 100 ("highly clean"). Syria ranks the second lowest along with South Sudan, at the 178th position among the 180 countries in the Index, on a scale where the lowest-ranked countries are perceived to have the most honest public sector.

Issues and specific cases

Transnational drug trade 
Syria was labeled as a narco-state by the United States for nearly a decade until 1997, during the Syrian occupation of Lebanon when they controlled the cannabis cultivation in the Beqaa Valley in Lebanon, and were the Middle East region's main source of hashish. During the Syrian Civil War, mass production of drugs within Syria began, and officers fed their men fenethylline, which they called "Captain Courage." Several shipments containing tonnes of amphetamines were seized in different countries smuggled from Syria, those shipments had sometimes millions of pills of fenethylline, which production in the country started since at least 2006. In November 2020, two drug shipments of hashish coming from Syria were seized by Egyptian authorities, the first shipment which arrived to Alexandria, included 2 tonnes of hashish, while the second shipment had 6 tonnes and was found at the Damietta port. The port of Latakia became under scrutiny of European and American police, as being favored by smugglers. In May 2021, Turkish security forces used UAVs to stop 1.5 tonnes of marijuana being smuggled out of Syria. According to the Centre for Operational Analysis and Research (COAR), Syrian seized drugs in 2020 had the value of no less than $3.4bn.

The New York Times reported in December 2021 that the 4th Armoured Division, commanded by Maher al-Assad, oversees much of the production and distribution of Captagon, among other drugs, reinforcing Syria's status as a narco-state on the Mediterranean sea. The unit controls manufacturing facilities, packing plants, and smuggling networks all across Syria (which have started to also move crystal meth). The division's security bureau, headed by Maj. Gen. Ghassan Bilal, provides protection for factories and along smuggling routes to the port city Latakia and to border crossings with Jordan and Lebanon.

References 

Syria
Corruption in Syria